Odontopaschia stephanuchra is a species of snout moth in the genus Odontopaschia. It is known from Samoa.

References

Moths described in 1935
Epipaschiinae